Samuel Black ISM (18 October 1905 – 1977) was a Scottish footballer who played as an outside left.

Often regarded as the greatest player to have represented Plymouth Argyle, he is the club's all-time record scorer with 182 goals. His career began in his native Scotland with Kirkintilloch Rob Roy, where he was spotted by Bob Jack. He moved to Devon in 1924 and became an instant favourite with the club's supporters. His goalscoring ability made him stand out from other wingers and his partnership with inside left Jack Leslie became legendary, as the club challenged for promotion to the First Division during the 1930s. Nicknamed The Mighty Atom, Black was known to play with a cigarette stub tucked behind his ear. He ended his career with Queens Park Rangers and returned to Plymouth during the war to work in the Royal Naval Armaments Depot. He was inducted into the Plymouth Argyle Hall of Fame in 2004.

Playing career
Standing at just five feet six inches tall, Black was the epitome of what a winger was like in the mid-twentieth century. In those days wingers rarely tracked back. They were not expected to do anything other than terrorise full backs. It was Black's eye for goal that made him stand out from other players in his position. He was comfortable using either foot and many of his goals came from unlikely angles with staggering regularity. He began his career with Kirkintilloch Rob Roy, a junior club based in East Dunbartonshire. His performances caught the eye of Bob Jack, a fellow Scot who was manager of Plymouth Argyle. Black joined the club in 1924 and scored on his Football League debut in a 7–1 win against Brentford. His skill on the ball and goalscoring ability made him a darling of the Home Park crowd and he formed a lethal partnership with Jack Leslie; they scored 320 goals between them in all competitions for Argyle. When rumours of interest from other club's surfaced, a Sammy Must Not Go! campaign sparked demonstrations and public meetings; Black was destined to remain as Argyle's talisman.

His last match for the club in January 1938, with Bob Jack still in charge of first team selection but due to retire at the end of the 1937–38 season. Black then joined Queens Park Rangers, having scored 182 goals in 491 appearances for the club. His stay at Loftus Road was ended abruptly by the outbreak of war and he returned to Plymouth having made just five league appearances. To mark Plymouth Argyle's 100th year as a professional club, the club's supporters were asked to vote on who they thought were the best to have represented Argyle during that time. Black was included alongside twelve other people, but he was the only one who played before the war.

Personal life
Black returned to Plymouth when his playing career was brought to an end to work in the Royal Naval Armaments Depot at HMNB Devonport as a storehouse assistant. He continued to live in the city after hostilities had ceased and was awarded the Imperial Service Medal in 1966 for his contribution to the depot. He died in 1977.

Career statistics

Honours
Plymouth Argyle
Football League Third Division South: 1929–30

Individual
Imperial Service Medal: 1966
Plymouth Argyle Hall of Fame: 2004
Plymouth Argyle Team of the Century: 2004

References

1905 births
Footballers from Motherwell
Scottish footballers
Association football wingers
Kirkintilloch Rob Roy F.C. players
Plymouth Argyle F.C. players
Queens Park Rangers F.C. players
English Football League players
1977 deaths
Royal Navy personnel of World War II
Scottish Junior Football Association players